Lubber may refer to:

 Lubber, a large, clumsy person
 Lubber line, navigational term for a fixed line pointing to the ship's bow or aircraft's nose
 Landlubber, sailor's term for a non-sailor
 Romalea microptera, a grasshopper whose English names include eastern lubber grasshopper, Florida lubber and Florida lubber grasshopper